Méray is a surname. Notable people with the surname include:

 Charles Méray (1835–1911), French mathematician
 Opika von Méray Horváth (1889–1977), Hungarian figure skater